Lançon may refer to the following places in France:

Lançon, Ardennes, a commune in the Ardennes department 
Lançon, Hautes-Pyrénées, a commune in the Hautes-Pyrénées department 
Lançon-Provence, a commune in the Bouches-du-Rhône department